Lichtenhain/Bergbahn is a former municipality in the district Saalfeld-Rudolstadt, in Thuringia, Germany. Since 1 December 2008, it is part of Oberweißbach.

History 
Lichtenhain/Bergbahn was first mentioned in 1455 and is located on the ancient trade route from Erfurt to Nuremberg. It once belonged to the sovereignty of Schwarzburg-Rudolstadt, later to the Principality of Schwarzburg-Rudolstadt.  In the Thirty Years' War the town was completely devastated. The main source of income of the residents was originally forestry, charcoal burning and resin extraction.  Later the trading of nature medicines ("Olitäten") became a major economic driver. In 1812 Lichtenhain/Bergbahn counted 375 inhabitants which rose to 524 in 1902. In 1923, the Oberweißbacher mountain railway opened which connected Lichtenhain with national railway network. Major industries in modern times were the glass industry and the thermometer production, after the Second World War, increasingly tourism.

The municipality Lichtenhain/Bergbahn was disbanded on 1 December 2008 and incorporated into the city of Oberweißbach. with administrative headquarters in Oberweißbach.

Politics 
The Council of the municipality Lichtenhain/Bergbahn consisted recently (as of the municipal election on 27 June 2004) of 6 Women and councilors.
 SPD 3 seats
 FW 3 seats
Ingo Lödel, the last honorary mayor, was elected on 27 June 2004.

Coat of arms

Transportation 
Lichtenhain/Bergbahn is connected to Oberweißbacher Bergbahn which connects Obstfelderschmiede (Mellenbach-Glasbach) with the village Cursdorf. The train consists of 1.351 km broad gauge cable railway and a connecting 2.635 km standard gauge electronic adhesion railway. The railway is operated by Deutsche Bahn AG and offers about thirty rides every half hour from 5:30 am to 8:00 pm.

Celebrities 
 Gerhard Botz (born 1955), Politician (SPD)

References

External links

Former municipalities in Thuringia
Schwarzburg-Rudolstadt